ORP may refer to:
 Okręt Rzeczypospolitej Polskiej, a  Polish Navy ship prefix
 Operational Ration Pack, UK military
 Orpington railway station, Bromley, England
 O'Reilly Raceway Park at Indianapolis
 Oxidation reduction potential in chemistry